Arfaka is a genus of true bugs belonging to the family Cicadidae.

Species:

Arfaka fulva 
Arfaka hariola

References

Cicadidae